Gurów massacre was a wartime massacre of the Polish population of Gurów, committed on 11 July 1943 by the Ukrainian Insurgent Army death squad from Group "Piwnicz" and Ukrainian peasants, during the Massacres of Poles in Volhynia and Eastern Galicia. The crime scene was the prewar village of Gurów located in Gmina Grzybowica, Powiat Włodzimierz in the Wołyń Voivodeship of the Second Polish Republic (since 1945: Volodymyr-Volynskyi Raion in the Volyn Oblast, modern Грибовицька волость, Ukraine). Gurów village no longer exists.

According to historian Władysław Filar, of the 480 Polish inhabitants of Gurów some 70 people managed to escape death by hiding from the assailants. Historians Władysław and Ewa Siemaszko were able to confirm by name the 200 Poles and 2 Jews killed in Gurów. The massacres, which began at 3 in the morning at Gurów Wielki and Gurów Mały, spread to nearby Wygranka, Zdżary, Zabłoćce, Sądowa, Nowiny, Zagaje (see: Zagaje massacre), Poryck (see: Poryck massacre), Oleń, Orzeszyn, Romanówka, Lachów, and Gucin.

References

1943 crimes in Poland
July 1943 events
Massacres in 1943
Massacres in Poland
War crimes committed by the Ukrainian Insurgent Army
Massacres of Poles in Volhynia